Rapala varuna, the indigo flash, is a species of lycaenid or blue butterfly found in the Indomalayan realm and the Australasian realm.

Description

Subspecies
R. v. orseis (Hewitson, 1863) Yunnan
R. v. simsoni (Miskin, 1874) Torres Straits Island, Cape York to Brisbane, Papua, Trobriand Island
R. v. guineensis (Staudinger, 1889) New Guinea
R. v. olivia Druce, 1895 Sulawesi
R. v. saha Fruhstorfer, 1912 Borneo
R. v. sagata Fruhstorfer, 1912 Bawean
R. v. arima Fruhstorfer, 1912 Lombok, Bali
R. v. ambasa Fruhstorfer, 1912 Nias
R. v. formosana Fruhstorfer, 1912 Taiwan
R. v. nada Fruhstorfer, 1912 Palawan
R. v. batilma Fruhstorfer, 1912 Tenimber
R. v. gebenia Fruhstorfer, 1914 Assam

References

Rapala (butterfly)
Fauna of Pakistan
Butterflies of Asia
Butterflies of Singapore
Butterflies described in 1863